Burr W. Jones (March 9, 1846January 7, 1935) was an American lawyer, politician, jurist, and law professor.  He was a member of the United States House of Representatives in the 48th Congress, and a justice of the Wisconsin Supreme Court.

Biography

Born in the Town of Union, in Rock County, Wisconsin Territory.  His father and mother had migrated to the Wisconsin Territory from Western Pennsylvania and Western New York, respectively.  His father, William Jones, died in 1855, and his mother then married Levi Leonard, a pioneer of Rock County.

Jones was raised on a farm and attended the Evansville Seminary, in Evansville, Wisconsin.  He then taught at the school for three years to pay for his university education.  He graduated from the literary department of the University of Wisconsin in 1870, and then from the law department in 1871.  After leaving the university, he studied law in the office of William Freeman Vilas and was admitted to the State Bar of Wisconsin that year.  Near the end of 1871, he began practicing law in Portage, Wisconsin, but within a year moved to Madison.  While in Madison, he went through a series of partnerships, with Alden Sprague Sanborn, A. C. Parkinson, F. J. Lamb, and E. Ray Stevens.

In November 1872, Jones was elected district attorney for Dane County, Wisconsin. He was then re-elected in 1874.  In 1882, he was elected to the 48th Congress (March 4, 1883 – March 3, 1885) on the Democratic Party ticket in Wisconsin's 3rd congressional district.  He was defeated seeking re-election in 1884.  In Congress, he served on the House Committee on War Claims, and served as acting Chairman when the chairman was unavailable with a long illness.

Jones returned to Madison and became a professor of law at the University of Wisconsin for the next thirty years of his life.  He remained involved in local affairs and government, serving as City Attorney in 1891, and as chairman of the first Wisconsin Tax Commission in 1897 and 1898.

In 1894 he served as attorney for University of Wisconsin professor Richard T. Ely during the effort to remove Ely for discussing socialism and allegedly holding unpopular views, the controversy which led to the sifting and winnowing statement.

He also remained active with the Wisconsin Democratic Party.  He was chairman of the Democratic State convention in 1892, and represented Wisconsin as a delegate to the 1896 Democratic National Convention at Indianapolis, where he was chosen to nominate Edward S. Bragg for president.

In 1920, he was appointed to the Wisconsin Supreme Court by Governor Emanuel L. Philipp, to fill the vacancy created by the death of justice John B. Winslow.  In April 1922, Jones was elected to fill the remainder of Winslow's term, which expired in 1926.  He did not seek re-election in 1925, and in January 1926 he was replaced by his former law partner E. Ray Stevens.

Jones returned to the practice of law.

Personal life and family
Jones married Olive L. Hoyt in December 1873.  They had one daughter together.  After the death of his first wife in 1906, he married Katharine McDonald, who survived him.

After thirty years as a professor at the University of Wisconsin Law School, he was conferred a LL.D. in 1916.  He was chairman of the Dane County Bar Association and, in 1908, was President of the State Bar Association.  In 1896, he published a treatise on the law of evidence in civil cases, followed by two subsequent volumes.

Jones died in a hospital in Madison, on January 7, 1935.  He was interred at Madison's Forest Hill Cemetery.

Legacy
One of the Kronshage dormitories at the University of Wisconsin–Madison is named after him, as well as a Madison city park on the Yahara River.

The television series Profiles in Courage did an episode in 1964 titled "Richard T. Ely" about the "sifting and winnowing" incident. Jones was played by Leonard Nimoy.

Electoral history

U.S. House (1882, 1884)

| colspan="6" style="text-align:center;background-color: #e9e9e9;"| General Election, November 7, 1882

| colspan="6" style="text-align:center;background-color: #e9e9e9;"| General Election, November 4, 1884

Wisconsin Supreme Court (1922)

| colspan="6" style="text-align:center;background-color: #e9e9e9;"| General Election, April 4, 1922

References

See also
 
 
 

1846 births
1935 deaths
People from Union, Rock County, Wisconsin
University of Wisconsin–Madison alumni
University of Wisconsin Law School alumni
University of Wisconsin Law School faculty
Justices of the Wisconsin Supreme Court
Democratic Party members of the United States House of Representatives from Wisconsin